West Mifflin Area School District is a suburban, public school district in the Commonwealth of Pennsylvania. It is located in the south hills of Allegheny County.  It serves the boroughs of West Mifflin, and Whitaker. As of 2007, the district also serves some students from the neighboring City of Duquesne. West Mifflin Area School District encompasses approximately 15 square miles.  According to 2000 federal census data, it serves a resident population of 22,802. In 2009, the district residents' per capita income was $18,240, while the median family income was $45,660.

Schools
West Mifflin Area High School: Grades served: 9–12
West Mifflin Area Middle School: Grades served: 4–8
Elementary schools
Clara Barton Elementary School: Grades served: K-3
Homeville Elementary: Grades served : Pre-K-3
New Emerson Elementary School: Grades served: K-3
Early Childhood Education Center building demolished. classes now held at Homeville Elementary.

References

External links
 West Mifflin Area School District

School districts in Allegheny County, Pennsylvania
Education in Pittsburgh area